Ansh Gupta (born 2 July 1996) is an Indian professional footballer who plays as a midfielder for I-League side Sudeva Delhi.

Club career
Born in Delhi, Gupta began his career with Sudeva Delhi in 2018 and was part of the squad announced when the side entered the I-League, India's second-tier football league. Gupta made his professional debut for Sudeva in their first match of the season against Mohammedan on 9 January 2021. He started and played 81 minutes as Sudeva were defeated 0–1.

Career statistics

Club

References

1996 births
Living people
People from Delhi
Indian footballers
Association football midfielders
Sudeva Delhi FC players
I-League players
Footballers from Delhi